The Iftikharyian family was one of the leading Persian families under the Ilkhanate. Native to Qazvin in Persian Iraq, the family claimed descent from the first caliph, Abu Bakr. However, the first recorded member of the family was Iftikhar al-Din Muhammad Bakri, who was a student of Yahya Naysaburi, who was in a turn a student of al-Ghazali (d. 1111). The family first rose to prominence in the 13rd-century during the Mongol invasion of Iran, where Iftikhar al-Din Muhammad became a member of the court of the Mongol khagan Ögedei Khan.

References

Sources 
 

Iranian families
People of the Ilkhanate